The LeRoy Public Library is the public library in Le Roy, Minnesota, United States.  It is a member of Southeastern Libraries Cooperating, the library region serving southeastern Minnesota.

References

External links 
 LeRoy Public Library

Buildings and structures in Mower County, Minnesota
Neoclassical architecture in Minnesota
Education in Mower County, Minnesota
Libraries on the National Register of Historic Places in Minnesota
Library buildings completed in 1915
Southeastern Libraries Cooperating
National Register of Historic Places in Mower County, Minnesota